Wyoming Valley is a historic industrialized region of Northeastern Pennsylvania.

Wyoming Valley may also refer to:

 Wyoming County, New York
 Star Valley, in the western U.S. state of Wyoming

See also